Anthony Wayne "Bubba" Green (September 30, 1957 – June 21, 2019) was a professional American football player who played defensive lineman for one season for the Baltimore Colts.

Background
Green was born in Cape May, New Jersey and grew up in Woodbine.  He graduated from Millville High School. His father, who was a police officer, left the family when Green was 13 years old. Despite Green's dyslexia, he was accepted at North Carolina State University, where he played football.

College career
Green entered North Carolina State in 1976 and lettered in football for four years. He was also a member of the 1977 and 1978 NC State track teams.

NFL
Green was picked in the 6th round of the NFL draft in 1981 by the Baltimore Colts.  Green wore jersey #91 and played right defensive tackle.  In his first season, he played in 15 games and started 10 of them with one interception, one fumble recovery and no sacks. Green suffered a knee injury and never played another game in the NFL.

Personal
Green lived with his wife, Nancy (Arrington), in Randallstown, Maryland. Green's daughter, Deanna Camille Green died in an accident on May 5, 2006, when she made contact with a chain-link fence that had become electrified by the city's power grid. The fence was part of a softball field in Baltimore's Druid Hill Park where Deanna was playing. Deanna was stretching before her at-bat when she touched the electrified fence. Her death was instantaneous. The Greens subsequently petitioned the Maryland Public Service Commission and the Maryland State Legislature for stricter safety measures. He died from cancer on June 21, 2019.

References

1957 births
2019 deaths
People from Cape May, New Jersey
People from Woodbine, New Jersey
Players of American football from New Jersey
African-American players of American football
American football defensive linemen
Millville Senior High School alumni
NC State Wolfpack football players
Baltimore Colts players
Deaths from cancer in Maryland